Erard I of Aulnay was lord of one half of the Barony of Arcadia in the Principality of Achaea.

Erard was a son of the first Baron of Arcadia, Vilain I of Aulnay. When Vilain died , his lands were divided among his two sons, Erard and Geoffrey. 

Like other Achaean nobles, Erard spent time at the court of the suzerain of the Principality, Charles I of Naples, who used them as councillors and go-betweens on affairs concerning the Principality. In 1269, he led of an embassy to Venice on behalf of Charles, hoping to persuade the Venetians to abandon their recently concluded truce with the Byzantines, but to no avail. 

Erard was taken prisoner by the Byzantines during the skirmishes with the Byzantine province in the southeastern Morea, sometime around 1279. He disappears from the sources thereafter, and is not mentioned as among those released in subsequent prisoner exchanges, meaning that he likely died in captivity. Erard had appointed John Chauderon and Peter of Vaux as administrators of his domains, but, disregarding his will, the Angevin  sequestered the lands, and it was not until 1293 that his brother, Geoffrey, managed to recover Erard's half of the barony.

References

Sources
 

13th-century births
13th-century deaths
Barons of Arcadia
Prisoners of war held by the Byzantine Empire
Deaths in custody
Ambassadors to the Republic of Venice
Kingdom of Sicily people